Shanthi Sriskantharajah (born 28 October 1965) is a Sri Lankan Tamil civil servant, politician and Member of Parliament.

Early life
Sriskantharajah was born on 28 October 1965.

Career
Sriskantharajah is a member of the Sri Lanka Administrative Service and a former Deputy Director of Planning. She is a member of the Illankai Tamil Arasu Kachchi (ITAK).

She was one of the Tamil National Alliance's (TNA) candidates in Vanni District at the 2015 parliamentary election but failed to get elected after coming fifth amongst the TNA candidates. However, after the election she was appointed as a TNA National List MP in Parliament.

Electoral history

References

1965 births
21st-century Sri Lankan women politicians
Illankai Tamil Arasu Kachchi politicians
Living people
Members of the 15th Parliament of Sri Lanka
People from Northern Province, Sri Lanka
Sri Lankan Tamil civil servants
Sri Lankan Tamil politicians
Sri Lankan Tamil women
Tamil National Alliance politicians
Women legislators in Sri Lanka